KK Napredak may refer to:
 Basketball teams in Serbia
 KK Napredak Aleksinac, based in Aleksinac (1957–present)
 KK Napredak Kruševac, based in Kruševac (1946–present)